"Hotel Lobby (Unc & Phew)" is a song by American rappers Quavo and Takeoff of the hip hop group Migos. It was released on May 20, 2022 and is their first release as the duo Unc & Phew. The song was produced by Murda Beatz, Keanu Beats and Fabio Aguilar.  It is released as the first single off their collaborative album Only Built for Infinity Links.

Background
The song was teased in February 2022 through Migos' Instagram account. Following its announcement prior to its release, fans noticed Offset's absence in the record, leading to speculation that Migos would break up.

Composition
The song finds Quavo and Takeoff rapping in their signature "triplet flow" about their wealth, over a trap beat.

Music video
A music video was released alongside the single and directed by Keemotion and Quavo. It pays homage to the 1998 film Fear and Loathing in Las Vegas, with Quavo and Takeoff taking the roles of characters Raoul Duke and Dr. Gonzo respectively. They drive through a desert, dodging bats and picking up hitchhikers, and stop at a "glitzy" Las Vegas hotel, where they are seen taking psychedelic drugs, drinking, smoking, and doing "comedic performances".

Charts

Weekly charts

Year-end charts

Certifications

References

2022 singles
2022 songs
Quavo songs
Takeoff (rapper) songs
Songs written by Quavo
Songs written by Takeoff (rapper)
Songs written by Murda Beatz
Song recordings produced by Murda Beatz
Motown singles